Sangia was a small town in the east of ancient Phrygia, near Mount Adoreus and the sources of the Sangarius.

Its site is unlocated.

References

Populated places in Phrygia
Former populated places in Turkey
Lost ancient cities and towns